Richard Ryan (1851–1933) was a United States Navy sailor and a recipient of the United States military's highest decoration, the Medal of Honor.

Biography
Born in 1851 in Waterbury, Connecticut, Ryan joined the Navy from that state. On that morning, while Hartford was at Norfolk, Virginia, Landsman James Mullen fell from a gun port into the water. Mullen, who could not swim, was being swept away by a strong tidal current. Ryan jumped overboard, swam to the drowning crewman, and kept him afloat until they were rescued by the ship's launch. For this action, he received the Medal of Honor weeks later, on March 23.

Ryan's official Medal of Honor citation reads:
Serving on board the U.S.S. Hartford, Ryan displayed gallant conduct in jumping overboard at Norfolk, Va., and rescuing from drowning one of the crew of that vessel, 4 March 1876.

Ryan died in 1933 at Sailors' Snug Harbor Hospital, Staten Island, New York, after being admitted on and off for over 30 years.  He is buried in Old Saint Joseph's Cemetery in Waterbury, Connecticut.

See also

List of Medal of Honor recipients during peacetime

References

External links

1851 births
1933 deaths
People from Connecticut
United States Navy sailors
United States Navy Medal of Honor recipients
Non-combat recipients of the Medal of Honor
Military personnel from Connecticut